Treanor may refer to:
Conor James Treanor (born 1998), English Actor
Frank P. Treanor (1855–1933), New York politician
Marc Treanor (1963–2020), British sand artist
Mark Treanor (born 1963), Scottish footballer
Matt Treanor (born 1976), American baseball player
Michael Treanor (born 1979), actor and martial arts fighter
Misty May-Treanor (born 1977), American professional beach volleyball player
Noel Treanor (born 1950), Catholic Bishop of Down and Connor
William Treanor (born 1957), American legal scholar

See also
Mayna Treanor Avent Studio, historic mountain cabin